The G.P. de Pont à Marcq-La Ronde Pévèloise  is a road bicycle race held annually in France. It is organized as a 1.2 event on the UCI Europe Tour.

Winners

References

UCI Europe Tour races
Cycle races in France
2010 establishments in France
Recurring sporting events established in 2010
2014 disestablishments in France
Recurring sporting events disestablished in 2014
Defunct cycling races in France